The 2013 AAMI Classic took place between 9–12 January 2013, at the Kooyong Stadium in Melbourne, Australia.

Seeds

Draw

Main draw

Play-offs

References
 Main Draw

External links
Official AAMI Classic website

Kooyong Classic
AAMI Classic